Nikodem Caro (23 May 1871, Łódź, then Russian Empire – 27 June 1935, Rome, Italy) was an industrial chemist and entrepreneur. Caro was born in Łódź, and studied chemistry in Berlin at the Royal Technical College of Charlottenburg (now Technical University of Berlin) and got his doctorate from Rostock University. From 1895 on he worked in the Deutsche Dynamit AG with Adolph Frank on the development of calcium cyanamide as a means of fixing nitrogen, hence the Frank-Caro process. Caro became an important figure in the nitrogen fixation industry and a rival of Fritz Haber.

Caro also contributed to the production of combat gases used by German troops during World War I. After the war he became the first president of Bayerische Stickstoffwerke AG.

Caro is the author of many works about various elements, synthesis a chemical compounds actions e.g. Gewinnung von Chlor und Salzsäure (1893), Landwirtschaftliche Untersuchungen (1895), Handbuch für Acetylen (1904), Die Torflager als Kraftquellen (1907).

After Hitler's rise to power he left Berlin, emigrating through Switzerland to Italy. Caro died in 1935 and was buried in Zürich.

See also
 Heinrich Caro, inventor of the "Caro's acid" (peroxymonosulfuric acid) 
 Poison gas in World War I

External links
Degussa-history.com - biography

References

1871 births
1935 deaths
Polish chemists
19th-century German chemists
Polish Sephardi Jews
20th-century German chemists
People from Łódź